Loli Kantor (born 1952) is an born Israeli-American photographer. Kantor was born in France.

Her work is included in the collection of the Museum of Fine Arts, Houston and the Harry Ransom Center at the University of Texas at Austin.

Kantor is the author of Beyond the Forest: Jewish Presence in Eastern Europe, 2004-2012.

References

Living people
1952 births
20th-century American photographers
21st-century American photographers
20th-century American women artists
21st-century American women artists